The Charity Bowl was a one-time postseason college football bowl game held on December 25, 1937, in Los Angeles, California. The game featured Fresno State and Central Arkansas. Fresno State won, 27–26.

Game result

References

Defunct college football bowls
1937–38 NCAA football bowl games
American football competitions in Los Angeles
1937 in California
College sports in Los Angeles